Elections to the City of Melbourne were held via postal ballot in October 2012 to elect 9 councillors to the council, as well as the direct election of the Lord Mayor and Deputy Lord Mayor of Melbourne. The incumbent Lord Mayor, Robert Doyle, and Deputy Lord Mayor, Susan Riley, were re-elected for a second four-year term.

At the 2012 election, the number of council seats increased from 7 to 9.

Results

Mayoral election

|- style="background-color:#E9E9E9"
! colspan="6" style="text-align:left;" |After distribution of preferences

The VEC distributed preliminary preferences until an electoral ticket exceeded 50 per cent of the vote, in this case Independent candidates Robert Doyle and Susan Riley.

Councillor election

References

 2012
2012 elections in Australia
2010s in Melbourne